This is a list of the seasons played by Stuttgarter Kickers from 1980 to the most recent seasons. The club's achievements in all major national competitions as well as the top scorers are listed. Top scorers in bold were also top scorers of the league.

Key 

Key to league record:
P = Played
W = Games won
D = Games drawn
L = Games lost
F = Goals for
A = Goals against
Pts = Points
Pos = Final position

Seasons

Notes

References

Seasons
Stuttgarter Kickers
Stuttgarter Kickers